Colonel John Chiswell (occasionally spelled in the era, Chizzell, per its pronunciation) (ca. 1710  October 14, 1766), was a planter, land speculator, early industrialist and member of the Colonial House of Burgesses who in his final years caused a scandal which led to his well-publicized death, possibly a suicide on the eve of his trial for killing a merchant in western Virginia.

Early life and marriage

The son of Esther Chiswell and her husband Charles Chiswell (born about 1678) was raised at Scotchtown, his father's plantation in Hanover County. Hanover county and the mansion house both date to 1719. In addition to cultivating tobacco on that plantation, Charles Chiswell was also a land speculator and at times Clerk of the General Court of Virginia.

John Chiswell married Elizabeth Randolph (daughter of William Randolph and sister of Peter Randolph, both members of the Governor's Council), on May 19, 1736. They had four children, all daughters: Elizabeth Chiswell (b. 24 May 1737); Susanna Randolph Chiswell (b. 1740); Mary Chiswell (b. about 1748) and Lucy Chiswell (born 3 Aug 1752). His wife survived him by a decade.

Career
When his father died in 1737, Chiswell inherited the Scotchtown plantation, and the following year he became the colonel of the Hanover County militia. He would continue to operate Scotchtown using overseers and enslaved labor until selling it to his political ally, business partner and son-in-law, Speaker John Robinson his father's land speculation westward, accumulating tens of thousands of acres. Chiswell's career in the House of Burgesses began in 1742, when he and Robert Harris won election from Hanover County, although Harris accepted the position of county surveyor and so only served a single year of the term, replaced by William Meriwether (who had previously held one of the seats and would serve alongside Chiswell in the part-time position until 1749, when replaced by John Syme, who was not then seated since the election was re-conducted and Henry Robinson elected). Chiswell began representing Williamsburg in the House of Burgesses in 1756, after Armistead Burwell died circa 1754 and was briefly replaced by the scholarly lawyer George Wythe.

By 1752, the year after Chiswell moved his main residence from his Scotchtown plantation to the colonial capital at  Williamsburg (and Chiswell continued to represent Hanover County during sessions of the House of Burgesses), Chiswell and George Gilmer, a local physician, had purchased the Raleigh Tavern in Williamsburg, and Chiswell also operated an ordinary (tavern and inn) in James City County.

Also by 1752, Chiswell was operating an iron furnace near Fredericksburg, Virginia, miles north of Scotchtown. At some point late in that decade, John Chiswell discovered lead outcroppings in then-vast Augusta County (in a part which became Wythe County. About 1760 he formed a partnership with Robinson, William Byrd and Francis Fauquier (then the colony's resident lieutenant governor). In 1762, Chiswell traveled to England to have the ore analyzed as well as hire miners to work alongside enslaved laborers. Chiswell also was part owner of copper mines in Albemarle and Augusta Counties. The Lead Mine Company, which was later involved in the John Robinson estate scandal. After Virginia declared its independence, the mines were operated by the state, and became an important lead supplier for the patriot cause.
The mines were so significant, that they became a landmark and part of a treaty in 1768 to establish the lands of Great Britain and the Native Americans in the Treaty of Hard Labour and the Treaty of Fort Stanwix. "..the treaty at Fort Stanwix, John Stuart on behalf of Great Britain had negotiated with the Cherokee tribe the treaty of Hard Labor, South Carolina, October 14, by which the boundary line was continued direct from Tryon Mountain to Colonel Chiswell's mine (present Wytheville, Virginia), and thence in a straight line to the mouth of the Great Kanawha."

Political life
John Chiswell was elected as a burgess from Hanover county from 1744 to 1755, when he moved to Williamsburg and represented the city from 1756 to 1758. He was closely aligned by marriage and family with many of the landed gentry and upper classes of Virginia.

Fort Chiswell
A fort was established in 1758 by William Byrd and named for Colonel John Chiswell. It was used during the French and Indian War, but was later abandoned. The Fort Chiswell Site is on the National Register of Historic Places.

Murder Scandal
On June 3, 1766, "pretty early in the morning," Colonel Chiswell got into an argument with "...a Scotch gentleman" named Robert Routledge a merchant from Prince Edward County, at Mosby Tavern, Cumberland County, Virginia, now Powhatan County, Virginia.  According to several eyewitnesses, Colonel Chiswell, who was a Loyalist, called Routledge "a fugitive rebel, a villain who came to Virginia to cheat and defraud men of their property, and a Presbyterian fellow…" Both men were intoxicated, and when Chiswell was frustrated in attacking Mr. Routledge with a "bowl of Bumbo" or candlestick, called for his sword and demanded that Mr. Routledge leave the room. When he refused, Chiswell killed him by stabbing him in the heart with his sword. For causing the death of Routledge, a justice of the peace remanded Colonel Chiswell the county gaol. He was later conveyed to the public gaol in Williamsburg. However, three justices of the General Court at Willamsburg, William Byrd, III of Westover, John Blair, Sr. and Presley Thornton, met the sheriff on the outskirts of the town and held a brief examining court. The result was Chiswell was allowed to post a small bail of £2,000. In the 18th century, bail, in any amount, for the crime of murder was virtually unheard of. Nonetheless, Chiswell was released and allowed to return to his home. There was immediate public outcry of favoritism and special treatment. At least one of the justices, William Byrd, was, in fact, Chiswell's friend and also a business partner in the lead mining operation.

As the murder scandal of Robert Routledge at the hands of John Chiswell unfolded, Virginians were still reeling from another scandal involving John Chiswell's late son-in-law John Robinson, Speaker of the House of Burgesses and Treasurer of Virginia. When Robinson died in May 1766 it was discovered that he had misappropriated public funds and his estate owed the Commonwealth of Virginia over £1,000,000.

Suicide
John Chiswell is thought to have committed suicide on October 14, 1766. His body was discovered on the floor of his home in Williamsburg, Virginia on October 15. The coroner stated it was an attack from nerves.

Because it is uncertain if he committed suicide, he was denied burial in the consecrated ground of Bruton Parish Church. His body was taken to his home at Scotchtown (plantation). When the wagon containing his coffin arrived, members of the murdered Robert Routledge family were there, and demanded that the coffin be opened so they could be sure he was dead, and the death was not a hoax. His grave is unmarked.

Legacy
 Fort Chiswell, Virginia is named in his honor.
 His home, The Chiswell-Bucktrout House on Francis Street in Williamsburg, Virginia, still stands.

References

Bibliography
 Kegley, Mary B. 2010. "Fort Chiswell and Chiswell's Lead Mines of Wythe County, Virginia: A New Perspective". Smithfield Review: Studies in the History of the Region West of the Blue Ridge. 14: 52-68. 
 Lemay, J. A. Leo. Robert Bolling and the Bailment of Colonel Chriswell. [Place of publication not identified]: [publisher not identified], 1971. (In Early American literature—Vol. 6, no. 2 (Fall 1971)).
 Shephard, William Hendy. Colonel John Chiswell, Chiswell's Lead Mines, Fort Chiswell. 1936. 
 Trotti, Michael Ayers. 2008. "The Origins of Virginia Crime Sensationalism". Abstract: This chapter describes how, over the next three months, the Virginia Gazette published fifteen articles on the Chiswell case, some anonymous, others pseudonymous, still others penned above the names of some of the most prominent Virginians of the era, including the colony's most influential lawyer, George Wythe, and a leading member of the House of Burgesses, John Blair. In all, the Virginia Gazette printed slightly more than six pages on this case over the course of four-and-a-half months, or about one-quarter of a page in each issue. In volume, the coverage was significant, particularly for this era; in tone, it was moderate, even tentative. In October, this flurry of activity ended when John Chiswell died of "nervous fits, owing to a constant uneasiness of mind" shortly before he was to go to trial.
 Virginia Gazette October 17, 1766.

1710 births
1766 deaths
18th-century American politicians
American planters
American slave owners
House of Burgesses members
Virginia colonial people